Zvee Scooler (December 1, 1899 – March 25, 1985) was a Russian-born American actor and radio commentator. He was born in Kamenets-Podolsky (now Ukraine) and his original surname was Shkolyar. He performed in both Yiddish and English, on the stage, television, and film. He is probably best known for his roles in Fiddler on the Roof, playing Mordcha, the innkeeper in the Broadway play and the rabbi in the film version. He appeared as Duddy's grandfather in the 1974 film "The Apprenticeship of Duddy Kravitz." Another of his more notable roles was that of Boris' father in Woody Allen's Love and Death.

He was known as the Grammeister on WEVD, a Yiddish radio station in New York City. Every Sunday, Scooler presented a ten-minute segment on the radio show, Forward Hour, which was news and commentary in rhyme.

He died in New York City on March 25, 1985, at age 85.

Filmography

References

External links

American male film actors
American people of Russian-Jewish descent
American male stage actors
Jewish American male actors
Yiddish theatre performers
Radio personalities from New York City
Emigrants from the Russian Empire to the United States
American people of Ukrainian-Jewish descent
Jews from the Russian Empire
1899 births
1985 deaths
20th-century American male actors
20th-century American Jews